The 2012 season of the 1. deild karla (English: Men's First Division) was the 58th season of second-tier football in Iceland and ran from 12 May 2012 until 22 September 2012. The league title was won by Þór Akureyri, who ended the campaign with a record of 16 wins, 2 draws and 4 defeats, giving them a total of 50 points. The Akureyri club, who had been relegated from the Úrvalsdeild in 2011, thereby achieved promotion back to the top level of Icelandic football at the first attempt. Also promoted to the Úrvalsdeild for the 2013 season were runners-up Víkingur Ólafsvík, who finished nine points clear of third-placed Þróttur Reykjavík.

At the other end of the table, ÍR finished bottom of the division after taking only 14 points from their 22 league matches and were thereby relegated to the 2. deild karla. Höttur were also relegated on the final day of the season after losing 0–1 away at Þór.

The top goalscorer for the 2012 season was Víkingur Ólafsvík midfielder Guðmundur Steinn Hafsteinsson, who netted 10 goals in 20 league appearances. Four other players were one behind on nine goals. In total, 387 goals were scored during the campaign at an average of 2.93 per match.

Club information

The league was contested by 12 clubs, eight of which had played in the 2011 season. There were four new clubs from the previous campaign:
Þór Akureyri and Víkingur Reykjavík were relegated from the Úrvalsdeild
Tindastóll and Höttur were promoted from the 2. deild karla

Locations and stadia

Statistics

League table

Results
Each team played every opponent once home and away for a total of 22 matches.

Top goalscorers

References

1. deild karla (football) seasons
Iceland
Iceland
2